Gamtel Football Club is a Gambian football club based in Banjul and sponsored by Gamtel. They play in the top division in Gambian football, the Gambian Championnat National D1.

1 June 2015, Gamtel FC are champs for the first time.

Achievements
Gambian Championnat National D1: 2
 2015, 2018.

Gambian Cup: 4
 2010, 2011, 2012, 2013.

Gambian Super Cup: 4
 2010, 2011, 2013, 2015.

Performance in CAF competitions
CAF Confederation Cup: 1 appearance
2014 – First Round

References

External links
Gamtel lift first ever FA Cup trophy
Roster from first round WAFU Cup game 

Football clubs in the Gambia